National Secondary Route 138, is a road between Route 4 and Route 35, contained in the north plains of the Alajuela province of Costa Rica.

Description

Starting west on Route 4, the road follows a slightly northeast direction towards Route 35. It is the main access route to the Caño Negro Wildlife Refuge. Most of the road is made of gravel, except for an asphalt segment on the west of the road.

Locations

The entire route is in Alajuela province.

History

References

Highways in Costa Rica